The Cherokee are Native American people.
There are three, currently existing, federally-recognized Cherokee tribes
The Cherokee Nation, based in Tahlequah, Oklahoma
The Eastern Band of Cherokee Indians, based in Cherokee, North Carolina
The United Keetoowah Band of Cherokee Indians, also based in Tahlequah, Oklahoma

Cherokee can also refer to:

Related to the Cherokee people
Cherokee Nation (1794–1907), the historical government that preceded the current Cherokee Nation
Cherokee language, spoken by the Cherokee peoples
Cherokee syllabary, a writing system for the Cherokee language, invented by Sequoyah
Cherokee (Unicode block), a block of Cherokee characters in Unicode

Places

Australia
Cherokee, Victoria, a locality

United States
Cherokee, Alabama, a town
Cherokee, California, an unincorporated community and census-designated place
Cherokee, Nevada County, California, a former mining community
Cherokee, Iowa, a city
Cherokee, Kansas, a city
Indian Hills-Cherokee Section, Kentucky, also known as Cherokee, a former city in Kentucky near Louisville
Cherokee Park, Louisville, Kentucky, a municipal park
Cherokee, North Carolina, a census-designated place
Cherokee, Ohio, an unincorporated community
Cherokee, Oklahoma, a city
Cherokee Turnpike, a toll road in eastern Oklahoma 
Cherokee, Tennessee, an unincorporated community
Cherokee Lake, Tennessee, a reservoir
Cherokee, Texas, an unincorporated community
Cherokee, West Virginia, an unincorporated community
Cherokee, Wisconsin, an unincorporated community
Cherokee Branch, Georgia, a stream
Cherokee Run (Ohio), a stream
Cherokee County (disambiguation)
Cherokee Township (disambiguation)

Businesses
Cherokee Inc., an American clothing company
Harrah's Cherokee, a casino and hotel in Cherokee, North Carolina
Cherokee Casino Roland, a casino complex located in Roland, Oklahoma
Cherokee Productions, an independent film production company founded by actor James Garner

Music
Cherokee (band), a later name for the rock band The Robbs
"Cherokee" (Ray Noble song), a 1938 jazz standard written by Ray Noble
"Cherokee" (Europe song), a 1987 song by Swedish rock band Europe
"Cherokee", a song by White Lion from their debut album Fight to Survive
"Cherokee", a song by John Moreland from his 2015 album High on Tulsa Heat
"Cherokee", a song by Cat Power from her album Sun
Cherokee Studios, a recording facility in Hollywood, California

Plants
Cherokee (grape), another name for the grape Catawba
Rosa laevigata, also known as the Cherokee Rose
Cherokee purple, a variety of heirloom tomato

People
Cherokee Fisher (1844–1912), American baseball player
Cherokee Parks (born 1972), American former basketball player
Crawford Goldsby (1876–1896), aka Cherokee Bill, American Old West outlaw

Schools
Cherokee Baptist Female College, original name of Shorter University, Rome, Georgia
Cherokee High School (disambiguation)
Cherokee Middle School, Cherokee, Alabama
Cherokee Immersion School, a Cherokee language immersion school in Park Hill, Oklahoma

Ships
, several Royal Navy ships
Cherokee class brig-sloop, a class of British Royal Navy vessels in the early 19th century
, ships of the United States Navy
Cherokee-class tugboat, a United States Navy class
 , a passenger-cargo liner sunk in World War II

Sports
Toledo Cherokee, a junior ice hockey team in the United States Premier Hockey League, based in Toledo, Ohio
Dodge Cherokee, an Argentine racing car
Torino Cherokee, an Argentine racing car

Transportation
Jeep Cherokee, sport utility vehicle models
Piper Cherokee, a family of light aircraft
Hall Cherokee, a homebuilt glider
Cherokee Railroad, a 19th century railroad in Georgia, United States
"Cherokee", a named night train of the Rock Island Rail Road, between Chicago and Tucumcari, New Mexico

Other uses
Cherokee (rocket), a 1950s American experimental rocket used in testing of ejection seats
Cherokee (nuclear test), a 1956 test using the first air drop of a thermonuclear weapon
Cherokee (web server), an open-source cross-platform web server
Cherokee Generating Station, a natural gas-fired power plant in Adams County, Colorado
Cherokee Nuclear Power Plant, an uncompleted project outside Gaffney, South Carolina

See also
Cherokee City, Arkansas, an unincorporated census-designated place
Cherokee Village, Arkansas, a city
Cherokee Village, Tennessee, an unincorporated community
Camp Cherokee (disambiguation), all in the United States
Cherokee National Forest, in Tennessee and North Carolina
Cherokee National Jail, Tahlequah, Oklahoma, on the National Register of Historic Places 
Cherokee Plantation (disambiguation), two plantations on the National Register of Historic Places
Cherokee Ranch, Douglas County, Colorado, a cattle ranch on the National Register of Historic Places
Cherokee Falls, Dade County, Georgia, a waterfall
Cherokee Group, a geologic group in Missouri and Iowa
Cherokee Shale, a geologic formation in Kansas
1st Cherokee Mounted Rifles, a Confederates States Army unit during the American Civil War
Cherokee darter, a species of freshwater fish